Bizerte-Sidi Ahmed Air Base  is a Tunisian Air Force base located approximately 7 km west of Menzel Abderhaman, and 9 km west-southwest of Bizerte.

Units stationed at the base are:

 No. 11 Squadron
 Jet trainer squadron, Aermacchi MB-326
 No. 15 Squadron
 Fighter squadron, Northrop F-5 Tiger/TigerII
 No. 21 Squadron
 Transport squadron, C-130 Hercules, Let L-410 Turbolet, G-222

World War II
During World War II it was used by the United States Army Air Forces Twelfth Air Force during the North African Campaign. It was known as Bizerte Airfield. Several Allied units used the base in 1943. It was a heavy bomber airfield used by B-17 Flying Fortress strategic bombers of the 2d Bombardment Group, between 2 and 9 December 1943. There was a major air depot co-located at Sidi Ahmen.

Post-World War II
AFRICOM secretly operates a drone base at Bizerte-Sidi Ahmed Air Base.

See also
 Boeing B-17 Flying Fortress airfields in the Mediterranean Theater of Operations

References

External links

 Maurer, Maurer. Air Force Combat Units of World War II. Maxwell AFB, Alabama: Office of Air Force History, 1983. .
 
 Tunisian Air Force order of battle

Military of Tunisia
Bizerte